"Vacancy" is a single by a Japanese American singer Kylee. The title track  "Vacancy" is the ending theme song to the anime Xam'd: Lost Memories.

Release history

Track listing
CD single

Personnel

"Vacancy"
vocals : Kylee
all other instruments : nature living
vocal direction : Hideki Ninomiya
mix : Eric Westfall

"Justice"
vocals : Kylee
drums : Jeff Bowders
produce : Linus of Hollywood
mix : Dave Trumtio

"Plan B"
vocals : Kylee
drums : Adam Marcello
produce : Linus of Hollywood
mix : Dave Trumtio

Music video
The music video for "Vacancy" was filmed at Kugenuma Seaside Skatepark in Kanagawa on October 6, 2008.

References

External links
 by RX-Records
2008 singles
2008 songs